John or Johnny Orr may refer to:

John Boyd Orr (1880–1971), Scottish doctor, biologist, politician and Nobel peace laureate
Sir John Orr (police officer, born 1918) (1918–1995), Scottish police officer and the first chief constable of Lothian & Borders Police
John Herbert Orr (1911–1984), American entrepreneur
John Leonard Orr (born 1949), American arsonist, former fire captain and arson investigator
John Orr (bishop) (1874–1938), Bishop of Tuam, Killala, and Achonry
John Orr (businessman), founder of John Orr's, a South African department store chain
Sir John Orr (police officer, born 1945) (1945–2018), Scottish police officer, Chief Constable of Strathclyde Police (1996–2001)
John Orr (rugby union), Scottish rugby football player
John Orr (scholar of French) (1885–1966), British linguist
John Stewart Orr (1930–2001), Scottish medical physicist and researcher
Johnny Orr (basketball, born 1918) (1918–1982), American basketball and baseball player
Johnny Orr (basketball, born 1927) (1927–2013), American basketball player and coach
John William Orr (1815–1887), known professionally as J. W. Orr, prominent American wood engraver
John Orr (bowls) (1870–?), Scottish lawn bowler
John Orr (bowls, born 1995) (born 1995), Scottish indoor bowler
John Orr (priest), Irish Anglican priest

See also 
John Orr's, former department store in South Africa
Orr (disambiguation)
Orr (surname)